Amoroso is a surname. Notable people with the surname include:

Alessandra Amoroso (born 1986), Italian pop/soul singer
 Alfred Amoroso (born 1951), chairman of Yahoo!
 Anthony Amoroso, Italian-American chef
 Bruno Amoroso (1936–2017), Danish/Italian economist
 Christian Amoroso (born 1976), Italian football defender
 Emmanuel Amoroso (1901–1982), Trinidadian reproductive physiologist and developmental biologist
 Franco Amoroso (born 1994), Argentine footballer
 Giovanni Amoroso (born 1949), Italian judge
 Luigi Amoroso (1886–1965), Italian mathematician and economist
 Márcio Amoroso (born 1974), Brazilian football striker
 Ryan Amoroso (born 1985), American basketball player
 Roberto Amoroso (1911–1994), Italian screenwriter and film producer
 Valerio Amoroso (born 1980), Italian professional basketball player

Italian-language surnames